Bigg Boss (or colloquially Bigg Boss Marathi) is the Marathi-language version of the reality television programme Bigg Boss based on Big Brother and airs on Colors Marathi. Mahesh Manjrekar hosted the show for four seasons.

The third season was planned to launch in May 2020, but was postponed due to the COVID-19 pandemic. However, the season started on 19 September 2021.

Overview

Concept 
Bigg Boss Marathi is a reality show based on the Hindi show Bigg Boss which too was based on the original Dutch Big Brother format developed by John de Mol Jr. A number of contestants (known as "housemates") live in a purpose-built house and are isolated from the rest of the world. Each week, housemates nominate two of their fellow housemates for eviction, and the housemates who receives the most nominations would face a public vote. Eventually, one housemate would leave after being "evicted" from the House. In the final week, there will be five housemates. remaining, and the public will vote for who they wanted to win. Unlike other versions of Big Brother, the Marathi version uses celebrities as housemates, not members of the general public.

The house 
The house is well-furnished and decorated. It has a range of modern amenities, but just two bedrooms, living area, kitchen, store room, smoking room, and four toilet bath rooms. There is a garden, pool, activity area and gym in the House. There is also a Confession Room, where the housemates may be called in by Bigg Boss for any kind of conversation, and for the nomination process. The House has no TV connection, no telephones, and no Internet connection. The set has been built on the place of Big Boss Hindi version. There are 100 cctv cameras which keep eye on contestants.

Rules 
They are not supposed to tamper with any of the electronic equipment or any other thing in the House. They cannot leave the House premises at any time except when permitted to. They cannot discuss the nomination process with anyone. They cannot sleep in the day time. Also, they need to wear mic all the time and speak in only Marathi language. Sometimes, the housemates may be nominated for other reasons, such as nomination by a person who has achieved special privileges (via tasks or other things), for breaking rules or something else. If something is very serious, a contestant may be evicted directly. All the rules have never been told to the audience, the most prominent ones are clearly seen. The inmates are not permitted to talk in any other language than Marathi language.

Nomination
Nomination is a mandatory activity, usually taking place on first day of the week in which all housemates need to take part unless directed by Bigg Boss. Each housemate nominates two other housemates for eviction. Housemates getting maximum nomination votes will be nominated for eviction from the house in that week and undergoes public vote (through Voot) for retention. On the weekend episode, usually one contestant with lowest public votes will be evicted from the house. A housemate may also be directly nominated for eviction by that week's captain of the house or for other reasons by the Bigg Boss. Housemates who are awarded 'immunity' can not be nominated by other contestants. Immunity is automatically given to the week's captain and can be earned by contestants through winning specific tasks or achieving secret tasks given by Bigg Boss. Sometimes, the captain can make a contestant immune from nomination upon Bigg Boss' direction. The housemates are not allowed to discuss about the nominations or the nomination process with each other.

Captaincy
The captaincy concept was introduced in the second season. A captain is selected for every week by the Bigg Boss through specific tasks or elected by the housemates. A captain will have additional privileges in the form of immunity from nomination for that particular week, exemption from participating in the task activities and a separate bedroom with facilities more than that of other contestants. The captain will be exempted from nomination procedure for his/her captaincy week and will have power to either nominate a housemate directly or make a housemate immune from nomination or rescue a nominated housemate, depending on Bigg Boss' decisions. Captain's main duty is to supervise the weekly task and make sure the conditions and stipulations are met and task is performed well to procure the 'luxury budget' for the next week. Captains should also keep an eye on house rules and may punish a housemate for violating the rules.

Broadcast 
Bigg Boss Marathi is aired on Colors Marathi. Everyday's episodes contain the main happenings of the previous day. Every weekend episode mainly focuses on an interview of the evicted contestant by the host.

Eviction 
Contestants are nominated every week by their housemates. Viewers cast their vote in favour of the contestants they would like to save from eviction. The contestant with the fewest votes is evicted from the house.

Events

Series details

Housemate pattern

Controversies

Season 1

 Resham Tipnis and Rajesh Shringarpure rumour relationship created controversy in the Bigg Boss House.
 On Day 8, The Khurchi Samrat Task divided the House into two groups leading to several controversies.

Season 2 

 During the Chor Bazaar Task, Shivani Surve tried to pull Veena Jagtap inside the jail. But, as she refused to come, both started fighting then Veena Jagtap kicked Shivani Surve.
 Shivani Surve had asked Bigg Boss to let her go home and threatened to file case against the makers if they don't do so. When Bigg Boss warned her for the same, she apologised to Bigg Boss.
 Abhijeet Bichukale was arrested from the house in connection with a cheque bouncing case.
 Parag Kanhere got into a physical fight with Neha Shitole. He ended up slapping her and physical altercation with Vaishali Mhade causing a ruckus in the House.

Season 3 

 Jay Dudhane and Utkarsh Shinde locked up Vikas Patil in the jail and did not allow him to come out as per the task. Vikas fought with them and questioned why they didn't want their own team member to win the captaincy. Vikas's friend Vishal Nikam went to help him out and opened the door of the jail by kicking.
 During one of the task, Sonali Patil and Mira Jagannath got into a physical fight. Mira informed Bigg Boss that she would hit Sonali if she continued to lock her in the task. Later, Bigg Boss had to ask both of them to stay away from each other.
 Jay Dudhane hid Adish Vaidya's pumpkin in the garden area. Jay held Adish and did not give him a chance to reach the winning line. Adish finding Jay's game unfair told Jay to be creative in task. This led to a heated argument between the two leading to them calling each other by inappropriate names. Adish also called out Jay for threatening him.

Season 4 

 Vikas Sawant and Rohit Shinde were seen getting embroiled in an argument regarding the Sugar and Ant task. While playing the task, the duo collided physically. Later, Rohit charged Vikas to beat him. The other members of the house stopped them and tried to resolve the quarrel between the two. Seeing the fight between them, Bigg Boss announced a punishment for them - putting both of them in jail.
 Rakhi Sawant was seen searching for her coffee as someone hid it inside the house. She threatened to create ruckus if she didn't find it. When Akshay Kelkar told her to do that, she started breaking utensils in the kitchen. She was also seen running towards Akshay Kelkar to attack him. Bigg Boss later nominated Rakhi as punishment for one week.
 Rakhi Sawant and Amruta Dhongade indulged in unwanted physical fight. It all started when Amruta Dh locked Rakhi Sawant in the washroom when she went to have a bath. Amruta opened Rakhi's door later and denied doing anything. As a revenge, Rakhi went to the washroom, filled a bucket full of water and flipped the same on Amruta Dh while the latter was getting ready on her bed. Amruta Dh and Rakhi later got into a physical fight while the rest of the housemates tried to solve the fight. Bigg Boss later told them that it was a last warning for them.

References

External links 
 Official Website at Colors Marathi

Colors Marathi original programming
Bigg Boss Marathi
Indian reality television series
Indian game shows
2018 Indian television series debuts
Indian television series based on non-Indian television series
Marathi-language television shows